Emil Robert Zettler (March 30, 1878 – January 10, 1946) American sculptor, born in Karlsruhe, Germany (or, Chicago, Illinois ) and  active in Chicago. The Art Institute of Chicago, where Zettler studied, awarded him the Potter Palmer Gold Medal in 1917 for his colored plaster sculpture Job. It was among the first works of art by a Chicagoan showcased at the Arts Club of Chicago.

He often worked with Prairie School architect George Grant Elmslie. He taught sculpture at the Art Institute of Chicago, rising to become head of its School of Industrial Arts. In 1931, Zettler married Edythe L. Flack, one of the Institute's assistant deans. The Institute commissioned Zettler to redesign its Frank G. Logan Medal. Among his students there was John Weaver. Zettler was tasked with designing the official medals for the Century of Progress World's Fair in 1933.

Works
Perkins, Fellows & Hamilton Studio and Office, Chicago, IL, 1917
Capitol Building and Loan Association, Topeka, KS, 1924
Frankenstein Memorial Chapel of Temple Sholom, Chicago, IL, 1928
First Congregational Church of Western Springs, Western Springs, IL, 1930

References

German sculptors
1878 births
1946 deaths
School of the Art Institute of Chicago faculty
20th-century American sculptors
20th-century American male artists
American male sculptors